The 1997–98 European Hockey League was the second edition of the European Hockey League. The season started on September 16, 1997, and finished on January 25, 1998.

The tournament was won by VEU Feldkirch, who beat HC Dynamo Moscow in the final.

A new points system was used in the first round of the tournament. The winner in regular time won 3 points; in case of a tie, an overtime is played, the winner in overtime won 2 points and the loser in overtime won 1 point.

First round

Group A

Group A standings

Group B

Group B standings

Group C

Group C standings

Group D

Group D standings

Group E

Group E standings

Group F

Group F standings

Quarterfinals

Final stage
(Feldkirch, Austria)

Semifinals

Third place match

Final

References
 Season 1998

1997–98 in European ice hockey leagues
European Hockey League